There are 3,144 counties and county-equivalents in the United States. The source of the data is the U.S. Census Bureau and the data is current as of the indicated year. Independent cities are considered county-equivalent by the Census Bureau.

Summary
Before the American Civil War, the wealthiest counties were primarily located in Louisiana and Mississippi, because of the high number of enslaved people, who were not included in the population.

Loudoun County, Virginia, a suburb of District of Columbia, is the highest-income county by median household income. Another District of Columbia suburb, Arlington County, Virginia, ranked as the highest-income county by median family income as of 2013.

Many of the top counties in the following lists are found in the Northeast Megalopolis, particularly in the Washington metropolitan area and the New York metropolitan area.

Median household income

2020 Census
Presented below are the 100 highest income counties in the United States by median household income according to the 2020 United States census. Virginia has the most counties in the top 100 with 18. It is followed by California with 11; Maryland with 10; New Jersey with nine; New York and Texas with six each; Illinois with five; Colorado, Massachusetts, and Minnesota with four each; Ohio and Pennsylvania with three each; Georgia, Indiana, Utah, and Washington with two each; and Connecticut, the District of Columbia, Iowa, Kansas, Kentucky, New Hampshire, New Mexico, Tennessee, and Wisconsin with one each.

2010 Census

2000 Census

Source: US Census Bureau: 2000 CensusNumber of counties by state in the top 100: Virginia 10 plus 5 independent cities, Maryland 9, California 8, New Jersey 8, Georgia 7, Colorado 6, Illinois 6, Minnesota 5, New York 5, Texas 5, Alaska 3, Connecticut 3, Ohio 3, Pennsylvania 3, Wisconsin 2, Massachusetts 2, Michigan 2, Indiana 1, Kansas 1, Kentucky 1, Missouri 1, New Hampshire 1, New Mexico 1, Tennessee 1, Utah 1. Twenty-five states do not have any counties in the top 100.

United States of America: $41,994

Per capita income

2010 Census

2000 Census

 Number of counties by state in the top 100': Colorado 10, Virginia 7 counties plus 3 independent cities, New Jersey 9, California 8, Florida 6, New York 6, Georgia 4, Maryland 4, Minnesota 4, Connecticut 3, Massachusetts 3, Michigan 3, Pennsylvania 3, Texas 3, Illinois 2, North Carolina 2, Ohio 2, Washington 2, Wisconsin 2, Idaho 1, Alaska 1, Alabama 1, District of Columbia 1, Indiana 1, Kansas 1, Missouri 1, Nevada 1, New Hampshire 1, New Mexico 1, Rhode Island 1, Tennessee 1, Utah 1, Wyoming 1. Eighteen states do not have any counties in the top 100. United States of America per capita average: $21,587''

Highest-income counties and places by state
For more detailed lists of rankings of counties and places in the individual states, see the following pages:

Alabama
Alaska
Arizona
Arkansas
California
Colorado
Connecticut
Delaware
Florida
Georgia
Hawaii
Idaho
Illinois
Indiana
Iowa
Kansas
Kentucky
Louisiana
Maine
Maryland
Massachusetts
Michigan
Minnesota
Mississippi
Missouri
Montana
Nebraska
Nevada
New Hampshire
New Jersey
New Mexico
New York
North Carolina
North Dakota
Ohio
Oklahoma
Oregon
Pennsylvania
Rhode Island
South Carolina
South Dakota
Tennessee
Texas
Utah
Vermont
Virginia
Washington
West Virginia
Wisconsin
Wyoming

See also
 List of United States counties by per capita income
 List of lowest-income counties in the United States

Notes and references

Economy-related lists of superlatives
Income in the United States

Lists of counties of the United States